The Monterey Branch Line is a railway line located in Monterey County, California. It runs  between Castroville, where it connects to the Union Pacific Coast Line, and Monterey, formerly running as far as Pacific Grove. It is roughly paralleled by California State Route 1 and is active to Sand City .

History
Originally built by the Monterey & Salinas Valley Railroad, the line was the first narrow gauge railroad to operate in California with 3-foot gauge tracks laid between Salinas and Monterey. The line saw financial issues very soon after opening and was purchased by a subsidiary of the Southern Pacific on September 29, 1879. A new branch north to Castroville was constructed by the new owners and the western portion converted to standard gauge with the Hotel Del Monte opening the following year. This allowed direct passenger leisure services to run from San Francisco. The line came under the auspices of Southern Pacific proper in 1888 and was extended west past Pacific Grove to a facility at Lake Mejella. By the 1950s, sand made the bulk of freight moved along the route. Passenger rail service ended with the cancellation of the Del Monte after April 30, 1971, when Amtrak took over passenger rail services in the United States. Tracks were realigned with the construction of State Route 1, but the rails west of Seaside were abandoned in 1979. The tracks in Pacific Grove and Monterey were removed in the 1980s and the former right-of-way is now the Monterey Bay Recreation Trail.

The Salinas River bridge was damaged in the 1989 Loma Prieta earthquake — reconstruction time as well as the closure of Fort Ord in 1993 left almost no activity on the line, and it was abandoned soon after that. The full line was purchased by the Transportation Authority for Monterey County (TAMC) in 2003 for $9.3 million ($ in  adjusted for inflation).

Planned restoration
Restoration of Del Monte-like service to Monterey had been identified as early as the Caltrans 1984–89 Rail passenger development plan. Amtrak declined to operate such service, but operations under Southern Pacific (by then running state-subsidized services) were studied with ridership forecast developed. The TAMC opted to initiate Caltrain service to Salinas station in 2021.

TAMC has put forward plans to rebuild the line and commence a rail service between Monterey and Castroville. The project calls for diesel light rail trains to operate at twelve stations from Custom House Plaza in Monterey and the future Castroville Caltrain station. The route was included in the 2018 California State Rail Plan as eligible for further study in 2022 and integration into the state rail network by 2040.

, Monterey–Salinas Transit plans to construct a busway on the former Monterey Branch Line between Marina and Sand City.

References

Transportation in Monterey County, California
Rail lines in California
Proposed railway lines in California
Rail trails in California
Southern Pacific Railroad